Punching at the Sun is a 2006 American drama film directed by Tanuj Chopra and starring Nina Edmonds, Misu Khan and Hassan El-Gendi.

Cast
Misu Khan as Mameet
Nina Edmonds as Shawni
Hassan El-Gendi as Uncle Sonny
Ferdusy Dia as Dia
Kazi Rahman as Parnav
Taran Singh as Ritesh
Mohammad Mirza	as Sanjay
Rana Quraishi as Priti
Farhad Asghar as Satish
Raymond Vasquez as Tali Perez

References

External links
 
 

American drama films
2006 drama films
2006 films
2000s English-language films
2000s American films